Faiz Ahmed (born 28 March 1995) is an Indian cricketer who plays for Railways. He made his first-class debut in the 2015–16 Ranji Trophy on 15 October 2015.

References

External links
 

1995 births
Living people
Indian cricketers
Railways cricketers
Sportspeople from Kanpur